Diego Lozano González, O. Carm. (1622–1681) was a Roman Catholic prelate who served as Bishop of Potenza (1677–1681).

Biography
Diego Lozano González was born on 20 Jul 1622 in Madrid, Spain and ordained a priest on 24 Feb 1646 in the Order of the Brothers of the Blessed Virgin Mary of Mount Carmel by Timoteo Pérez Vargas, Titular Bishop of Lystra.
On 15 Mar 1677, he was selected by the King of Spain and confirmed by Pope Innocent XI on 13 Sep 1677 as Bishop of Potenza.
On 19 Sep 1677, he was consecrated bishop by Carlo Pio di Savoia, Cardinal-Priest of San Crisogono, with Giovanni Antonio Melzi, Archbishop of Capua, and Ludovico Ciogni, Bishop of Venafro, serving as co-consecrators. 
He served as Bishop of Potenza until his death on 10 Sep 1681.

References

External links and additional sources
 (for Chronology of Bishops) 
 (for Chronology of Bishops)  

17th-century Italian Roman Catholic bishops
Bishops appointed by Pope Innocent XI
1622 births
1681 deaths
Carmelite bishops